Sir Robert Young (26 January 1872 – 13 July 1957) was a trades unionist and Labour Party politician in the United Kingdom.

Young was born in Glasgow, and attended Mossbank Industrial School in the city before taking up a career in engineering. He subsequently became one of the first students enrolled at Ruskin College, Oxford. Following his graduation he delivered some of Ruskin's extramural lectures to union branches and co-operative societies. In 1910 he married Bessie Laurina Choldcroft, and they had three children.

In 1906 he became a member of the permanent staff of the Amalgamated Society of Engineers, becoming the union's assistant secretary in 1913 and its general secretary in 1919. He was awarded the OBE in 1917.

At the 1918 general election, he was elected as Member of Parliament (MP) for Newton in Lancashire, which eventually led to his resignation from his union post. He was appointed Deputy Speaker of the House of Commons in the first Labour government of 1924. He was reappointed to the position by the second Labour government of 1929 - 1931.

He lost his seat at the 1931 general election to the Conservative Reginald Essenhigh, but regained it at the 1935 general election. For the next fifteen years he was to be a member of a number of parliamentary committees, and chaired the Select Committee on House of Commons Procedure and the Standing Committee for the Consideration of Bills.

Young was knighted in 1931, and retired from the House of Commons at the 1950 general election.

Among his interests outside parliament, he was chairman of the Workers Temperance League and independent chairman of the Ophthalmic Benefit Approved Societies.

References

External links 
 

1872 births
1957 deaths
Amalgamated Engineering Union-sponsored MPs
Labour Party (UK) MPs for English constituencies
UK MPs 1918–1922
UK MPs 1922–1923
UK MPs 1923–1924
UK MPs 1924–1929
UK MPs 1929–1931
UK MPs 1935–1945
UK MPs 1945–1950
Alumni of Ruskin College
General Secretaries of the Amalgamated Engineering Union